Madhu Neelakandan, sometimes spelled Madhu Neelakantan (born 12 July 1971) is an Indian cinematographer from Muvattupuzha, Kerala, known for his work in the Malayalam and Bollywood film Industries. He is a graduate of the Film and Television Institute of India, Pune. He won the Kerala State Film Award for Best Cinematography for Annayum Rasoolum in 2012 and for Churuli in 2022. His other noted works include, Churuli, Kammatipaadam, Aami, Ramante Edanthottam and Rani Padmini. He is a part of Collective Phase One, a creative group that has produced films such as ID and Njan Steve Lopez.

Early life 
Madhu Neelakandan was born on 12 July 1971 to S.Neelakantan Nair and Radhamaniamma. He has a brother named Reghu. Madhu and Sreeja has a son named Govindan

Filmography

References

External links
 

1973 births
Living people
Film and Television Institute of India alumni
Malayalam film cinematographers
Film directors from Kochi
21st-century Indian photographers
Cinematographers from Kerala